The BDM-Werk Glaube und Schönheit (German for BDM Faith and Beauty Society) was founded in 1938 to serve as a tie-in between the work of the League of German Girls (BDM) and that of the National Socialist Women's League. Membership was voluntary and open to girls aged 17 to 21.

Purpose 

Nazi Germany's Reichsjugendführer (RJF; "National Youth Leader") Baldur von Schirach established the Faith and Beauty Society in 1938
to act as a link between the Bund Deutscher Mädel (BDM) and the  Nationalsozialistische Frauenschaft. The general idea was that "girls" should take part in working for the whole Volksgemeinschaft (German community) before they either went on to jobs orideallyto marry and have children.

According to Dr. Jutta Rüdiger, who had taken over as the leader of the League of German Girls in 1937:
The task of our Girls League is to raise our girls as torch bearers of the national-socialist world. We need girls who are at harmony between their bodies, souls, and spirits. And we need girls who, through healthy bodies and balanced minds, embody the beauty of divine creation. We want to raise girls who believe in  Germany and our leader, and who will pass these beliefs on to their future children.

See also 

 Saxon Greeting

References

Sources 

 "Das BDM Werk Glaube und Schoenheit" DVD, Zeitreisen Verlag
 "Ein Leben fuer die Jugend" by Dr. Jutta Ruediger
 BDM Historical Research Site

External links 
 Extensive English language website on the BDM
 Hitler Youth Forum

1938 establishments in Germany
Hitler Youth
Youth in Germany
Organizations established in 1938